Cathedral Road may refer to:

Cathedral Road, Cardiff, in Wales
Cathedral Road, Letterkenny, in Ireland

See also
Cathedral Square (disambiguation)